Los Alerces Airport  is an airstrip  north-northeast of Chaitén, a coastal city in the Los Lagos Region of Chile.

There is mountainous terrain in all quadrants.

See also

Transport in Chile
List of airports in Chile

References

External links
OpenStreetMap - Los Alerces
OurAirports - Los Alerces
FallingRain - Los Alerces Airport

Airports in Chile
Airports in Los Lagos Region